, or , is an indoor sporting arena located in Okayama, Okayama Prefecture, Japan. The capacity of the arena is 8,000 people and was opened in 1982. It hosted some of the group games for the 2003 FIVB Volleyball Men's World Cup.

Indoor arenas in Japan
Sports venues in Okayama Prefecture
Volleyball venues in Japan
Sport in Okayama
Sports venues completed in 1982
1982 establishments in Japan